Jesús Arturo Esparza (born 26 August 1990) is a Mexican long-distance runner. In 2020, he competed in the men's race at the 2020 World Athletics Half Marathon Championships held in Gdynia, Poland.

In 2017, he represented Mexico at the 2017 Summer Universiade, held in Taipei, Taiwan, in the men's half marathon event. He finished in 23rd place.

He competed in the men's marathon at the 2020 Summer Olympics in Tokyo, Japan.

References

External links 
 

Living people
1990 births
Place of birth missing (living people)
Mexican male long-distance runners
Mexican male marathon runners
Competitors at the 2017 Summer Universiade
Athletes (track and field) at the 2020 Summer Olympics
Olympic athletes of Mexico
Olympic male marathon runners
21st-century Mexican people